In human anatomy, the sacral plexus is a nerve plexus which provides motor and sensory nerves for the posterior thigh, most of the lower leg and foot, and part of the pelvis. It is part of the lumbosacral plexus and emerges from the lumbar vertebrae and sacral vertebrae (L4-S4).  A sacral plexopathy is a disorder affecting the nerves of the sacral plexus, usually caused by trauma, nerve compression, vascular disease, or infection. Symptoms may include pain, loss of motor control, and sensory deficits.

Structure
The sacral plexus is formed by:
 the lumbosacral trunk
 the anterior division of the first sacral nerve
 portions of the anterior divisions of the second and third sacral nerves
The nerves forming the sacral plexus converge toward the lower part of the greater sciatic foramen, and unite to form a flattened band, from the anterior and posterior surfaces of which several branches arise.
The band itself is continued as the sciatic nerve, which splits on the back of the thigh into the tibial nerve and common fibular nerve; these two nerves sometimes arise separately from the plexus, and in all cases their independence can be shown by dissection. Often, the sacral plexus and the lumbar plexus are considered to be one large nerve plexus, the lumbosacral plexus.  The lumbosacral trunk connects  the two plexuses.

Relations
The sacral plexus lies on the back of the pelvis in front of the piriformis muscle and the pelvic fascia. In front of it are the internal iliac artery, internal iliac vein, the ureter, and the sigmoid colon. The superior gluteal artery and vein run between the lumbosacral trunk and the first sacral nerve, and the inferior gluteal artery and vein between the second and third sacral nerves.

Nerves formed
All the nerves entering the plexus, with the exception of the third sacral, split into ventral and dorsal divisions, and the nerves arising from these are as follows of the table below:

Additional images

See also
 Cervical plexus
 Brachial plexus
 Lumbar plexus

Notes

References

External links

 
 
 
 Illustration at backpain-guide.com

Nerve plexus
Spinal nerves
Nerves of the lower limb and lower torso